Welzheim is a town in the Rems-Murr district, in Baden-Württemberg, Germany. It is located 35 km east of Stuttgart, and 15 km northwest of Schwäbisch Gmünd.
Welzheim has 11,239 (2005) inhabitants and is located in the 'Welzheimer Wald', a forest in the north-east of Württemberg.

The district of Welzheim and its surrounding villages are mainly rural and agricultural. Because of the big forest areas, the timber industry remains a big part of local business.

There are many beautiful natural areas near Welzheim, including the lake 'Ebnisee' and a hiking trail 'Mühlenwanderweg' (mill hiking trail), which follows many mills located in the 'Welzheimer Wald'. In the town itself, there are sights such as the St. Gallus Church and the town hall.

History
The history of Welzheim reaches back to the time of the Roman Empire. Around the year 160 AD the Romans founded a colony and two forts there; linguists reconstructed their Latin name as (Castra) Valentia on the base of the town's medieval name Wallenzin first mentioned in 1181. In 1980, for the 800th anniversary of the founding of the city, the eastern part of the ruins was reconstructed, and in 1993 an archeological park was founded on the site. The western part of the fort was built over through the years. The history of the settlement after the fall of the Roman Empire is in darkness, until the year 1266 when Welzheim was granted city's-rights.

In 1499 the church of Saint Gallus was consecrated, presumably as a new parish.

On 5 September 1726, a fire destroyed the entire city. The church was burned down to its foundations, though it was soon rebuilt. The city hall was rebuilt in 1731.

The district of Welzheim became part of the county of Waiblingen in 1938, and has been a deanery of the Evangelical-Lutheran Church in Württemberg since 1977.

During World War II there was a small concentration camp near the city, today identified euphemistically to as simply "The Prison." The camp held 10,000-15,000 prisoners. The most famous prisoner during this time was the Communist labor unionist Friedrich Schlotterbeck, of the Luginsland resistance group. A previous inhabitant of Welzheim, aged ten in 1945, testified how he would witness how the camp would regularly hang several inhabitants on Tuesday to make room for incoming camp internees. [2] In the churchyard, where 35 of the concentration camp's victims are buried, there is a memorial to these events.

The author Justinus Kerner lived in Welzheim from 1812 to 1816.

Churches and religious organizations
Besides the Protestant Saint Gallus church, and the Catholic Church of Christ the King, there is also a CVJM, the South German Alliance, and several other free-church unions such as the Baptists, Evangelical Free Church Union, Evangelical-Methodist Church, New Apostolic Church, the Evangelical Brethren, and even a mosque.

References

[2] Private Interview Calgary, Canada, 2004.

Towns in Baden-Württemberg
Rems-Murr-Kreis
Franconian Circle